The 2013 Eastern China smog was a severe air pollution episode that affected East China, including all or parts of the municipalities of Shanghai and Tianjin, and the provinces of Hebei, Shandong, Jiangsu, Anhui, Henan, and Zhejiang, during December 2013. A lack of cold air flow, combined with slow-moving air masses carrying industrial emissions, collected airborne pollutants to form a thick layer of smog over the region. Levels of PM2.5 particulate matter averaged over 150 micrograms per cubic metre; in some areas, they were 300 to 500 micrograms per cubic metre.

It was one of the worst bouts of air pollution in the area, cutting visibility and causing major disruption in transportation and daily activities. Airports, highways, and schools were closed.

Background
In January 2013, China experienced massive fog and haze outbreak affecting about 600 million people and covering seventeen provinces, municipalities and autonomous regions, a fourth of China's territory. On 12 September 2013, the State Council announced the "Air Pollution Prevention Plan". China limited the fine particulate matter level, and the Chinese government officials' assessment index included improving the environment for the first time.

On 4 November 2013, the Chinese Academy of Social Sciences and the China Meteorological Administration jointly released the "Green Paper on Climate Change: Addressing Climate Change (2013)". It stated that the fog and smog in China had increased in the past 50 years with the number of fog-free days significantly reduced, while that of the smog days were significantly increasing with the phenomenon of persisting smog days. The fastest growing fog and smog days occurred in the Pearl and Yangtze River Delta regions, which are the most industrialized areas. The report also indicated that the main reason of increased fog and smog days is the yearly increase in fossil fuel consumption in China. The report calls for urgent implementation of regional joint prevention and control measures to effectively solve the air pollution crisis.

Weather
The mixture of natural fog and unnatural smog started accumulating over the first weekend of December 2013. In Shanghai, the Air Quality Index (AQI) crossed the threshold of 300 on 2 December. The lingering smog also left the air qualities in neighboring cities, such as Nanjing, Jiaxing, at seriously polluted levels. The National Meteorological Center (NMC) issued yellow alert for smog and fog, the third most serious alert in China's four-tiered system. PM2.5 particulate levels reached their highest point on 6 December 2013, with Shanghai reaching a high of 507. The U.S. Embassy categorizes air quality readings over 300 as hazardous to all humans, not just those with heart or lung ailments.

The polluted air appears gray on the image and most of the pollution is trapped in the lower boundary layer of a few hundred meters.

Causes
Coal burning is a primary source of fine particle air pollution. It increased as the weather worsened during winter months and residents burned more coal to keep warm. This increased the amount of sulphate and nitrate (results of coal combusting), which led to higher PM2.5. Research suggests that 41% of the carbon that made up these high PM2.5 levels in Shanghai were also from coal burning.

Additionally, there were pollution from industrial sources. Jiangsu, Anhui, Shandong, Henan and many eastern provinces are heavy coal-burning regions. Research shows that prevailing winds blew low-hanging air masses of factory emissions (mostly SO2) towards the east coast of China. Regional transportation also had a significant impact on air quality.

The State Environmental Protection Administration investigates tens of thousands of polluters every year, shutting down thousands of the worse offenders, but has failed to reach its target of reducing emissions by 2 percent. In 2011, a factory manufacturing solar panels in Zhejiang province had been shut down because of toxic emissions of fluorine polluting air and water, sickening nearby residents.

Effects on major cities and provinces

Shanghai

Air in Shanghai was reported to have a strange taste – astringent and smoky, with an aftertaste of earthy bitterness. It was possible to feel the dust-like particulate matter on tongues.

With such a high concentration of air pollutants, government authorities warned residents of health symptoms, such as coughing and headaches. Citizens were advised to wear protective masks and use air purifiers. Many sanitation workers were required to wear dust masks during work early in the morning. Schools were closed as the government ordered children to stay indoors and reduce outdoor activities as much as possible.

Construction work was halted, and authorities pulled nearly one-third of government vehicles from the roads. A majority of inbound flights were cancelled and more than 50 flights were diverted at Shanghai Pudong International Airport.

Nanjing
The heavy smog greatly polluted central and southern Jiangsu Province, especially around Nanjing, capital of East China's Jiangsu province. AQI remained at "severely polluted" for five straight days, "heavily polluted" for nine, and hit a record-breaking value of 331. PM10 also went over 500 at times. On 3 December 2013, levels of PM2.5 particulate matter averaged over 943 micrograms per cubic metre, decreasing to over 338 micrograms per cubic metre on 4 December. Between 3:00 pm, 3 December and 2:00pm, 4 December local time, several expressways from Nanjing to other Jiangsu cities were closed, stranding dozens of passenger buses in Zhongyangmen bus station. From 5 to 6 December, Nanjing's air pollution stayed at red alert, suspending classes in all middle and primary schools and kindergartens. Experts say these figures indicate high levels of dust on construction sites. Children's Hospital outpatient services increased by 33 percent; the general incidence of bronchitis, pneumonia, upper respiratory tract infection increased significantly. The smog dissipated 12 December. Officials blamed the dense pollution on lack of wind, automobile exhaust emissions under low air pressure and coal-powered district heating system in North China.

Jiangxi
Visibility was reduced to less than 50 meters. Many highways in East China's Jiangxi province were closed.

Environmental impacts
The severe smog is raising awareness in re-assessing China's air pollution. On 12 February 2014, China's cabinet announced that government will implement a series of measures aimed at shifting the primary energy source from coal to natural gas and renewables. Pricing mechanisms will be used to favor cleaner alternatives to coal. Financial incentives will be offered to encourage green energy companies. The government will place tougher controls over emissions and better support for developing clean technologies. It will also set up a 10 billion renminbi (US$1.7 billion) fund to help companies to meet new environmental standards.

Pollutants 

PM2.5, a particulate matter with a diameter of 2.5 micrometers or less, is one of the major components of the air pollution in Eastern China, contributing to the growing smog problem in large areas across cities.

The composition of PM2.5 particles varies, and they are often made of heavy metals and various toxic compounds, such as lead and sulfate. Small particles can be suspended in the air for long periods of time due to their low masses. While some particles such as large-size carbon may be seen as soot and smoke, most of them can only be detected with a microscope. The Chinese Academy of Sciences indicated that smog in Beijing is a combination of both artificial factors and natural factors. While various causes such as coal burning and car emissions come from human activity, natural causes such as the humid weather and a lack of wind also contributed to the smog.

A study in 2005 in Beijing showed that PM2.5 is mostly composed of carbon, SO salts, NO salts, and NH salts. PM2.5 is a byproduct of the process of coal burning from power stations and produces significant amounts of sulfate, black carbon, ammonium, and nitrate. In 1989, 32.7% of PM2.5 particulates in Beijing came from burning of coal, which decreased to 16.4% in 2000, as people started to use cleaner energy such as natural gas. Automobile exhaust also significantly contributed to the smog problem. More importantly, such chemicals, along with organic carbon released from coal burning, may react with each other in the air, creating more toxic, harmful particles made of SO and NO.

PM2.5 particles are small enough to pass through the human respiratory system and reach the lung, causing problems like heart attacks and asthma attacks. In northern China, people live, on average, 5.5 years fewer than those in southern China, because of the over-reliance on burning coal for heating systems, which produces huge amounts of PM2.5 pollutants in winter.

Pollution from China has already affected other countries, and some ozone-forming particles have travelled across the Pacific Ocean to the United States, contributing to a relatively high level of ozone on the American West Coast. While these particles, along with other ozone-related chemicals, can be carried up to 30,000 feet above the ground, researchers in the United States predict that these pollutants may play a bigger role in the near future.

Bacteria in PM2.5 
Scientists are still trying to understand the microorganisms within PM2.5 particles and how they are spread through pollutants. Research indicated that many kinds of pathogens and bacteria can be spread through PM2.5 smog and cause diseases. For example, Chinese researchers have found that smog in Beijing contains significant amounts of inhalable microbial allergens and pathogenic species, which increase the risk of respiratory diseases. The same study also reported that among all the microorganisms within PM2.5 particles, 86.1% are bacteria, 13% eukaryota, 0.8% archaea, and 0.1% viruses. The smog contains a variety of microorganisms such as Actinomycetota, Pseudomonadota, Chloroflexota, Bacillota, Bacteroidota, and "Euryarchaeota". Many of these are not harmful to humans, but some pathogenic microorganisms are carried through smog, and their numbers increase as the pollutant level increases.

More than 1,300 kinds of microorganisms have been detected on PM2.5 particles. Because PM2.5 particles have relatively large surface area, many microorganisms from the soil easily attach to them, spreading them quickly through wind. For example, scientists detected that Aspergillus fumigatus var. fumigatus, a fungus which triggers allergic reactions in the respiratory system, are 1% to 8% of microorganisms found on PM2.5 particles.

Index 
The United States Environmental Protection Agency (EPA) has developed an Air Quality Index that is used to report air quality. This AQI is divided into six categories indicating increasing levels of health concern. A PM2.5 concentration lower than 12 μg/m3 indicates good air quality and between 12 and 35 μg/m3 the airquality is moderate. An AQI value over 300 represents hazardous air quality and below 50 the air quality is good. In December 2013, huge areas of Eastern China reached "hazardous" level for multiple days.

See also

1930 Meuse Valley fog
1939 St. Louis smog
1948 Donora smog
2013 Northeastern China smog
Great Smog of London
Pea soup fog

References

External links
 Real-time air quality index map
 Forbes
 PRI

2013 disasters in China
2013 in the environment
Environmental disasters in China
2013 meteorology
Air pollution in China
2010s in Shanghai
History of Nanjing
Smog events
Weather events in China
December 2013 events in China